Old Hachita is a ghost town in New Mexico. Once a bustling mining town, Old Hachita is now abandoned, its ruins slowly wasting away in the desert sun.

References

External links

Ghost towns in New Mexico